Aleksandar Jovančević (born 5 June 1970) is a Serbian strength and conditioning coach and former wrestler. He was FR Yugoslavia representative in Greco-Roman wrestling.

International wrestling career 
Jovančević competed in 82 kg men's Greco-Roman wrestling for FR Yugoslavia in 1996 Summer Olympics in Atlanta, US and placed 9th. In 1997, he won two bronze medals at the European Wrestling Championships in Kouvola, Finland and at the Mediterranean Games in Bari, Italy.

During his wrestling career he competed for wrestling clubs: Gavrilović Petrinja (1989–1991), Partizan (1992–1993) and Vojvodina (1994–1998).

Strength and conditioning coaching career 
Jovančević graduated physical education at the University of Novi Sad. He began his coaching career in 2000. Before he moved to train basketball players he worked with the Vojvodina handball and the Vojvodina water polo team in Novi Sad.

Basketball 
Jovančević worked as a part of the coaching staff of Serbian coach Dušan Alimpijević while he worked for the Vojvodina Srbijagas, the Spartak and the FMP of the Basketball League of Serbia.

He joined the Crvena zvezda coaching staff after Alimpijević become their head coach for the 2017–18 season. He left the club after that season.

Career achievements and awards 
 As wrestler
 Yugoslavia Wrestler of the Year Award: 1997
 The Bronze Order by Wrestling Federation of Serbia (2012)
As strength and conditioning coach
 Serbian League champion: 1  (with Crvena zvezda: 2017–18)

References

1970 births
Living people
Competitors at the 1997 Mediterranean Games
KK Crvena zvezda assistant coaches
Mediterranean Games bronze medalists for Yugoslavia
Olympic wrestlers of Yugoslavia
People from Petrinja
Serbian male sport wrestlers
Serbian men's basketball coaches
Serbian strength and conditioning coaches
Serbs of Croatia
University of Novi Sad alumni
Wrestlers at the 1996 Summer Olympics
Yugoslav male sport wrestlers
Yugoslav Wars refugees
Mediterranean Games medalists in wrestling
European Wrestling Championships medalists